The 2014–15 NIFL Premiership (known as the Danske Bank Premiership for sponsorship reasons) was the seventh season of Northern Ireland's highest national football league in this format since its inception in 2008, the 114th season of Irish league football overall, and the second season of the league operating as part of the Northern Ireland Football League. The season began on 9 August 2014, and concluded with the final round of fixtures on 25 April 2015.

Cliftonville were the two-time defending champions, after they won a second consecutive title the previous season, a first consecutive title win in the club's history - their fourth outright league title and fifth overall. Ten years after suffering relegation to the second tier in 2004–05 and just eight years after their return to the top flight in 2006–07, Crusaders were this season's champions. They lifted the title for the fifth time overall on 18 April 2015 – their first top flight title in the 18 years since their last win in the 1996–97 season.

For the second successive season, the newly promoted club finished bottom of the table and suffered relegation. Institute were relegated back to the second tier after only one season in the top flight. This was confirmed after they lost 2–1 against Ballymena United on 11 April 2015, leaving them bottom of the table by nine points with only two fixtures remaining. Warrenpoint Town once again finished in 11th place – the Promotion/relegation play-off place – and faced Bangor over two legs for a place in next season's Premiership. After a 2–2 draw on aggregate, Warrenpoint Town won 3–1 on penalties to retain their Premiership status for next season.

Teams
In their first season back in the top flight since 2005–06, Ards finished bottom of the table the previous season. This was confirmed on 12 April 2014, after Warrenpoint Town defeated Dungannon Swifts 4–0 to leave Ards 10 points adrift in 12th place with only three fixtures remaining. Subsequently, Ards were relegated to Championship 1. Institute replaced them in the Premiership, after securing the 2013–14 Championship 1 title. Institute returned to the top flight for the first time in four years since they were relegated in the 2009–10 season.

The Promotion/relegation play-off was not played the previous season because the runners-up of Championship 1, Bangor, were ineligible for promotion as they did not possess a licence to participate in top-flight football. As a result, this gave a reprieve to the previous season's 11th-placed team, Warrenpoint Town, who retained their Premiership status by default.

Stadia and locations

Windsor Park redevelopment
As a result of Windsor Park being redeveloped, its capacity was limited to approximately 10,500. This was still more than large enough to accommodate the average Premiership attendance at the stadium. Linfield were forced to play their first six league games of the season away from home while a new playing surface was laid at the stadium. Linfield's first home league game of the season was on 13 September 2014 against Warrenpoint Town, which resulted in a 1–0 home win. On 31 March 2015, the West Stand of the stadium was sealed off after cracks in the structure were discovered. Construction work related to the stadium redevelopment had been ongoing behind the stand in the weeks prior to the damage, but it was not known if that was directly related. The closure of the stand ultimately forced Linfield to play their remaining two home games of the season against Glenavon and Crusaders at the Ballymena Showgrounds and the Oval respectively.

League table

Results

Matches 1–22
During matches 1–22 each team played every other team twice (home and away).

Matches 23–33
During matches 23–33 each team played every other team for the third time (either at home, or away).

Matches 34–38
During matches 34–38 each team played every other team in their half of the table once. As this was the fourth time that teams had played each other this season, home sides were chosen so that they had played each other twice at home and twice away.

Section A

Section B

Promotion/relegation play-off
11th-placed Warrenpoint Town played NIFL Championship 1 runners-up Bangor over two legs for a place in next season's Premiership. Warrenpoint Town played the first leg away from home, with home advantage for the second leg. Warrenpoint Town won 3–1 on penalties and retained their Premiership status.

2–2 on aggregate after extra time. Warrenpoint Town won 3–1 on penalties.

Season statistics

Top goalscorers

NIFL Premiership clubs in Europe 2014–15

UEFA coefficient and ranking
For the 2014–15 UEFA competitions, the associations were allocated places according to their 2013 UEFA country coefficients, which took into account their performance in European competitions from 2008–09 to 2012–13. In the 2013 rankings used for the 2014–15 European competitions, Northern Ireland's coefficient points total was 3.083. After earning a score of 1.000 during the 2012–13 European campaign, Northern Ireland was ranked by UEFA as the 47th best association in Europe out of 54 - up one place from 48th the previous season.

 45  Liechtenstein 3.500
 46  Luxembourg 3.375
 47  Northern Ireland 3.083
 48  Wales 2.583
 49  Estonia 2.208
 Full list

UEFA Champions League

After winning the league last season, Cliftonville were the sole representatives in the 2014–15 UEFA Champions League. They entered in the second qualifying round, and were drawn to face Debrecen from Hungary. In the first leg at home, they held their full-time opponents to a 0–0 draw. In the away leg they held out until the second half, but in the end conceded twice to go out of the competition 2–0 on aggregate.

First Leg

Second Leg

Debrecen won 2–0 on aggregate.

UEFA Europa League

2013–14 League runners-up Linfield, third-placed Crusaders, and the Irish Cup winners Glenavon earned a place in the UEFA Europa League. They all entered the draw in the first qualifying round. Linfield were paired against B36 Tórshavn from the Faroe Islands, the same team they had defeated on penalties in the 2012–13 UEFA Champions League first qualifying round. They came away with a 2–1 victory in the first leg away from home – their third consecutive away win in Europe. Crusaders faced Ekranas from Lithuania and secured a 3–1 win in the first leg at home. Irish Cup holders Glenavon faced FH from Iceland. They lost the first leg 3–0 away from home, having held out at 0–0 until the 82nd minute.

Linfield played their home leg at Glenavon's Mourneview Park as a result of the redevelopment of Windsor Park. They secured a 1–1 draw to go through to the next round for the second successive season – 3–2 on aggregate. Crusaders also made it through to the next round, after a 2–1 away win in their second leg against Ekranas. This was Crusaders' first ever away win in Europe, and the first time they had won both legs of a European tie. Glenavon restored some pride in their second leg, scoring two goals. However, they lost the match 3–2 and exited the competition 6–2 on aggregate.

First qualifying round
First Legs

Second Legs

Linfield won 3–2 on aggregate.

Crusaders won 5–2 on aggregate.

FH won 6–2 on aggregate.

Second qualifying round
First legs

Second legs

AIK won 2–1 on aggregate.

Brommapojkarna won 5–1 on aggregate.

References

2014-15
North
1